Spartanburg is a city in the U.S. state of South Carolina.
 Spartanburg County, the county that the city is located

Spartanburg may also refer to:

South Carolina

Education
Spartanburg Community College
Spartanburg County School District 7
Spartanburg Day School
Spartanburg High School
Spartanburg Methodist College

Healthcare
Spartanburg Regional Healthcare System

Sports
Spartanburg Spinners, former minor-league baseball team

Transportation
Spartanburg (Amtrak station)
Spartanburg Downtown Memorial Airport
Greenville-Spartanburg International Airport

See also
Spartanburg, Indiana, unincorporated community
Spartansburg, Pennsylvania, small borough